William Best may refer to:

William Best (cricketer) (1865–1942), English cricketer
William Thomas Best (1826–1897), English organist
William Best, 1st Baron Wynford (1767–1845), British politician and judge
William Best, 2nd Baron Wynford (1798–1869), British peer
William Best (Nova Scotia politician) (1707–1782), Nova Scotia politician, one of the founders of Halifax
William Best, composed the music for the song "(I Love You) For Sentimental Reasons"
Willie Best (1916–1962), American television and film actor

See also
John William Best (1912–2000), British Royal Air Force pilot